Dendrolirium lasiopetalum, synonym Eria lasiopetala, is a species of orchid. It is native to a region from Bangladesh east to Hong Kong, south through much of Southeast Asia to Java.

References

Eriinae
Orchids of Asia
Flora of Assam (region)
Plants described in 1805